Vacuolar protein sorting 37 homolog A (S. cerevisiae) is a protein in humans that is encoded by the VPS37A gene. It is a member of the endosomal sorting complex required for transport (ESCRT) system.

Clinical significance 

A missense mutation (K382N) in VPS37A protein has been shown to cause complex hereditary spastic paraparesis (cHSP).

References

Further reading